The 1963 Columbia Lions football team was an American football team that represented Columbia University during the 1963 NCAA University Division football season. Columbia finished sixth in the Ivy League. 

In their seventh season under head coach Aldo "Buff" Donelli, the Lions compiled a 4–4–1 record and outscored opponents 190 to 165. Allison F. Butts was the team captain.  

The Lions' 2–4–1 conference record placed sixth in the Ivy League standings. Columbia was outscored 116 to 113 by Ivy opponents. 

Columbia played its home games at Baker Field in Upper Manhattan, in New York City.

Schedule

References

Columbia
Columbia Lions football seasons
Columbia Lions football